Lionel Khoo (born 27 March 1995) is a Singaporean swimmer. In 2015, Khoo won silver in the men's 200m breaststroke and gold in the 4 × 100 m medley relay at the SEA Games. In October 2016, he set a new national 200m breaststroke record at the Fina/airweave Swimming World Cup held at the OCBC Aquatic Centre, Singapore. Finishing fifth with a record of 2:11.80, he rewrote the previous record of 2:16.19 set at the 2016 ASEAN University Games in July.

Personal life
Khoo's parents signed him up for swimming lessons after being pushed into the pool by a friend at the age of three. He started competitive swimming at the age of eight, and at 12, represented Singapore during the age groups.

A former student of Anglo-Chinese School (Independent), Khoo served national service in 2014 as a Special Constable Sergeant (SC/SGT) at the Tanglin Police Division.

A first-year student at the Singapore Management University's Lee Kong Chian School of Business, Khoo represented the university at the 2016 ASEAN University Games in July, where he set a new record of 2:16.19 for the 200m breaststroke.

Career
While serving national service, Khoo started to train for the SEA Games 2015 where he won gold in the men's 4 × 100 m medley relay and silver in the men's 200m breaststroke. Together with Joseph Schooling, Quah Zheng Wen and Clement Lim, the team also broke the 4 × 100 m relay game and national record.

Khoo holds the record in the Short Course (25m) for the 50, 100 and 200 metres breaststroke and the 4 × 100 m relay with Joseph Schooling, Quah Zheng Wen and Rainer Ng. For Long Course (50m) events, he broke the two national records for the 100 and 200 metres breaststroke events in 2016. He also broke the national record for the Short Course mixed relay with Rainer Ng, Tao Li and Mylene Ong. As of December 2016, he holds 8 national records.

He competes in the 50, 100 and 200 metres breaststroke, and 4 × 100 m medley relay.

At the 2019 Southeast Asian Games, Lionel won a historic gold and broke the SEA Games record in the 50m breaststroke final with a time of 28.15. He became the first Singaporean male to clinch a breaststroke gold at the Games since Ng Yue Meng's victory in 1989. He also won Bronze in the 100m breaststroke event and another gold in the 4 × 100 m medley relay with Quah Zheng Wen, Joseph Schooling and Darren Chua.

References

1995 births
Living people
Singaporean male breaststroke swimmers
Male medley swimmers
Singaporean sportspeople of Chinese descent
Swimmers at the 2010 Asian Games
Swimmers at the 2018 Asian Games
Southeast Asian Games medalists in swimming
Southeast Asian Games gold medalists for Singapore
Southeast Asian Games silver medalists for Singapore
Southeast Asian Games bronze medalists for Singapore
Competitors at the 2015 Southeast Asian Games
Competitors at the 2017 Southeast Asian Games
Competitors at the 2019 Southeast Asian Games
Asian Games competitors for Singapore
Male breaststroke swimmers
21st-century Singaporean people